Patience Peterson-Kundok (born 29 September 2001)  is a Ghanaian professional footballer, who plays as a midfielder for Hakkarigücü Spor in the Turkish Women's Football Super League.She was a member of the Ghana national U-17  and U-20 teams.

Club career 

Peterson-Kundok played for Ampem Darkoa Ladies F.C. in her country's Premier League. In the 2020–21 season, she scored five goals in 28 matches played.

She went to Armenia in August 2021, and joined Noravank SC. In October 2022, she moved to Turkey and signed a one-year contract with Hakkarigücü Spor to play in the Women's Super League.

International career 
Peterson-Kundok appeared severaal times in the  Ghana national U-17 (Black Maidens) and the U-120 (Black Princesses) teams. She played for the Ghana U-20 team at the 2018 FIFA U-20 Women's World Cup held in France. She was called up to the U-20 team again for the 2020 FIFA U-20 Women's World Cup qualifying round.

References 
 

2001 births
Living people
People from Bono East Region
Ghanaian women's footballers
Ghana women's international footballers
Women's association football midfielders
Ghanaian expatriate women's footballers
Ghanaian expatriate sportspeople in Armenia
Ghanaian expatriate sportspeople in Turkey
Expatriate women's footballers in Turkey
Turkish Women's Football Super League players
Hakkarigücü Spor players